Century 21 Merchandising and Century 21 Toys were merchandising companies associated with Gerry Anderson's Century 21 Productions. There was also a publishing line, Century 21 Publications which (in partnership with City Magazines) created the comic book titles TV Century 21 and Lady Penelope (among others); and a music department, Century 21 Music which marketed audiobooks and soundtracks from the series.

Most of the companies' activities were marketing products produced by Century 21 Productions — in particular Thunderbirds, Captain Scarlet and the Mysterons and Joe 90, although some of the various spin-off media were based on characters and machines from other media franchises, often connected to Lew Grade's ITC Entertainment.

History 
The various "Century 21" brands predate Century 21 Productions — immediately following completion and the first TV screening of Thunderbirds in 1964, AP Films was renamed Century 21 Productions to align it with its growing merchandising sister companies Century 21 Merchandising, Century 21 Toys, Century 21 Music, and Century 21 Publications.

By the beginning of 1969, Century 21 Productions had become financially over-stretched. Within a few months, they had disbanded their three warehouse-sized studios on the Slough Trading Estate.

Century 21 Publishing 
From 1965 to 1969, Century 21 Publishing partnered with the published City Magazines to produce weekly comics titles based on Anderson's Supermarionation properties. Century 21 packaged the comics, hiring the editors, writers and artists, which were then printed and distributed by City Magazines. The imprint's most prominent and long-running titles were TV Century 21 (later known as TV21) and Lady Penelope; three other related titles — Solo, TV Tornado, and Joe 90 Top Secret — eventually merged into TV21.

Century 21 Merchandising acquired a line of plastic science fiction toys manufactured in Hong Kong, which they marketed under the name Project SWORD.  Although not based on Anderson's creations, Project Sword did feature in two series of comic strips and text stories published by City Magazines/Century 21 Publications. The only Anderson craft made by the line was a model of Zero-X, the spacecraft which first appeared in the film Thunderbirds are GO. A comic strip series based on the toys appeared in the short-lived comic Solo. After Solo was merged into TV21, a second series of stories — text, illustrated by comics artists such as Ron Embleton and Don Lawrence — appeared. The publisher also released a Project SWORD annual, featuring text and comic strips.

In June 1969 the entire staff of Century 21 Publications were given a month's notice. A small nucleus of staff from the disbanded division were taken on by Leonard Matthews and Alf Wallace — the ex-managing editors of Fleetway Juvenile Comics; and Eagle and Odhams' Power Comics line, respectively — who were now operating an independent studio off Fleet Street under the name of Martspress. Martspress packaged the relaunched version of TV21 which soon phased out the Anderson-related content.

Century 21 Music

Mini-Albums
A range of 37 "mini-albums" (7-inch EPs) were released under the Century 21 label. These were a combination of original material, with abridgments of TV episodes with linking narration, and soundtracks.

References

AP Films
1960s toys
Merchandising